Mario Gilberto Sánchez Huerta (24 June 1926 – 24 January 1987) was a Mexican footballer. He competed in the men's tournament at the 1948 Summer Olympics.

References

External links
 

1926 births
1987 deaths
Mexican footballers
Mexico international footballers
Olympic footballers of Mexico
Footballers at the 1948 Summer Olympics
Place of birth missing
Association football forwards
Club América footballers